Deadman (Boston Brand) is a superhero appearing in American comic books published by DC Comics. He first appeared in Strange Adventures #205 (October 1967), and was created by Arnold Drake and Carmine Infantino.

Publication history

Deadman's first appearance in Strange Adventures #205, written by Arnold Drake and drawn by Carmine Infantino, included the first known depiction of narcotics in a story approved by the Comics Code Authority. The series is most associated with the art and writing of Neal Adams and the writing of Jack Miller, who took over from Infantino and Drake after the first story. The first story and all of the Adams stories were reprinted in 1985 as a seven-issue series.

Drake recalled in an interview, "So here I was in the middle of a Zen-Buddhist movement and I thought, 
"Maybe I can use that for my main character," 

Although he appeared from time to time in the 1970s and 1980s as a supporting character in various comics, including Jack Kirby's Forever People, Deadman did not get his own series again until 1986, in a four-issue limited series written by Andrew Helfer and drawn by José Luis García-López, which picked up the story where Adams left off. Deadman's next major storyline was in Action Comics Weekly, in 1988–1989. After this, he starred in the two-issue series Deadman: Love After Death, drawn by Kelley Jones and written by Mike Baron. This was followed by the limited series Deadman: Exorcism in 1992, also written by Mike Baron and drawn by Kelley Jones. Jones' gaunt, zombie-like rendition of the character would later appear in the pages of Batman. There was a Deadman ongoing series in 2002, which lasted nine issues, as well as a couple of standalone issues. His cameo appearances also continued, including several issues of Alan Moore's run on Swamp Thing, and Neil Gaiman's The Books of Magic. He had a cameo in books two and three of  Batman: Gotham County Line, which was released in November 2005. In 2009, Deadman was a featured title in the Wednesday Comics.

The character and self-titled series have won several awards, including the 1967 Alley Award for Best New Strip (by Arnold Drake and Carmine Infantino in Strange Adventures), and the 1968 Alley Award Hall of Fame (for Neal Adams). DC Comics published a slipcased hardcover edition collecting the original Deadman stories in December 2001. Deadman's retconned origin is revealed in Brightest Day #14 (2010), written by Geoff Johns and Peter Tomasi. Deadman has a 3-part mini-series called Deadman: Dark Mansion of Forbidden Love written by Sarah Vaughn and the art was done by Lan Medina.

Fictional character biography
Deadman is a ghost, formerly a circus trapeze artist named Boston Brand who performed under the name Deadman, a stage persona including a red costume and white corpse makeup. When Brand is murdered during a trapeze performance by a mysterious assailant known only as the Hook, his spirit is given the power to possess any living being by a Hindu god named "Rama Kushna" to search for his murderer and obtain justice. It is established in Green Arrow (vol. 4) #4, that Deadman believes Rama is the supreme being of the universe.

At the end of the Neal Adams story line, Deadman seems to discover the truth behind his murder and the ultimate fate of Hook, who killed Deadman as part of an initiation into a society of contract killers who then kill him to silence him.  However, the real Hook is one among many one-handed men who work for an organization known as "The Scavengers". This group steals advanced technology for a profit. Fighting the Scavengers also led to Deadman gaining an artificial body for some time, thanks to the influence of the Forever People. This group had rented rooms from Trixie Magruder, an old circus companion of Deadman.

Various missions
Rama also maintained a city for some time, called Nanda Parbat. The most evil people in the world came to live there, where Rama's power kept them sane and good. One of the worst was Darius Caldera, who almost destroyed the world when he left the city. Nanda later fell due to a combined military and mystical force. All the evil people are now back in the real world, still a danger. Brand's twin brother, Cleveland, is killed while possessed by Boston, while doing Boston's circus act. The killer was out to kill Boston Brand. His "benefactor", Rama Kushna, also dies to defeat Jonah, a spirit similar to Deadman. Around this time, Deadman assists the Spectre in defeating a newly formed demonic being and werewolves. Formed from the skeletons of many souls in hell, this blue-eyed, blonde-haired being comes to Earth to foment chaos and death. It manages to actually remove much of the Spectre's substance. Deadman is forced to merge with Spectre until things are stabilized.

Later, Deadman receives a birthday present from his diminutive friend, Max Loomis. Max places himself in a trance so he could "meet" Deadman and the two take a pleasant journey down "memory lane", mainly Deadman's more pleasant memories of Nanda Parbat. Soon after, Loomis meets with old circus friends and Deadman involves himself in a case of suspected murder. Deadman wants to go after the escapees of Nanda Parbat, but Max thinks pursuing the murder is a better course. Over several years, a mysterious stranger has Deadman travel through time to try to save the souls of deceased heroes from the menace of Caldera. Due to the mental influence of various forces, Deadman is unable to use the knowledge of the timestream to benefit humanity. With the assistance of the spirits of the deceased heroes, Deadman defeats Caldera and the powers behind him. Max Loomis provides vital help on the material plane. After that, Boston and Loomis decide to hunt down the other Parbat escapees.

Youth and Hell
In the Sins of Youth incident, Deadman is one of the dozens of heroes reduced to a preteen age by Klarion the Witch Boy and an alien machine owned by Doiby Dickles. He is still a spirit, now with a lower-case d on his chest. He assists Secret in confronting Teekl, Klarion's companion, in an effort to restore everyone. He also joins in the fight against mystically created and mystically altered villains. During the Day of Judgment incident, Boston Brand travels with a group of heroes to the frozen wastelands of Hell. Their goal is to restart the demonic fires, thus recalling all the demons from the earthly plane. An accident strands Brand and the others under the frozen waters of the River Styx, forcing them to live out what would be, to them, Hell. For Brand, it is that the sharpshooter hits him in the shoulder, thus he survives. Brand feels he needs to die to learn "how to live". His battles against the demons would come back to haunt him. In the four-part Black Baptism miniseries, Deadman and several other "Sentinels of Magic", the magical group formed out of the Day of Judgment incident, are hunted by the Diablos. Partly fueled by revenge, they subdue many of the Sentinels and drain their magic. The JLA eventually rescue them all and destroy all the Diablos.

Blackest Night

Boston Brand begins to hear the voices of the dead and his own remains calling for him to protect them. Being a spirit, he is unable to stop his body from being raised as a Black Lantern. He attempts to possess his own body but is ejected after experiencing extreme physical and emotional pain during the attempt. He assists Batman, Robin, and Red Robin in repelling the invasion of the Black Lanterns. Deadman manages to save Commissioner Gordon from the Black Lanterns by possessing the body of his daughter, spiriting them both to safety.

Deadman is later sent by Batman to possess the body of Jason Blood, invoking the power of Etrigan. Deadman uses Etrigan's demon flame to hold back the Black Lanterns, but struggles to maintain control over the demon's body, finally being forced out. Deadman then frees Batman and Red Robin, who had frozen themselves to escape the Black Lanterns' onslaught. He is later seen inside the Black Lantern Damage's ring, apparently having followed Jean Loring, Mera and the Atom when they shrank down into it. He frees Mera and the Atom from Loring by briefly possessing her, allowing them time to return to normal size. During this incident he says he believes possessing the Black Lanterns causes him damage. He is later seen at Nanda Parbat, attempting to stop the Black Lanterns attempting to pass through the spiritual barrier by taking over their bodies and ripping them apart. He briefly loses himself to a Black Lantern's personality, but is saved by the Phantom Stranger. The Stranger convinces Deadman to enter his body again, telling them it is his destiny to bring it within Nanda Parbat. With the Stranger's help, Deadman is able to force the black ring off his body, bringing it through the gate of Nanda Parbat. The body, which the Stranger states is of "singular importance", is placed under the gatekeeper and Blue Devil's protection, and Deadman heads out, intent on sharing the information he gleaned while inside the Black Lanterns with Hal Jordan. In the aftermath of the final battle, Deadman, wearing a White Lantern ring, is resurrected by the power of the white light.

Brightest Day
In the 2010–11 miniseries Brightest Day, Deadman discovers that his white power ring can restore the dead to life, and begins to acclimate to living again, including exercising self-preservational habits, though he expresses reservations about being alive again. As he attempts to learn what his mission on Earth is, he teams up with Hawk and Dove. Deadman learns that he will cross paths with the person the Entities chose to guard the Earth. The Entity also instructs Deadman to embrace life and those around him, as he led a selfish life in his previous one, realizing the value of others only after he died. In learning to appreciate his new life, Deadman realizes that he and Dove have fallen in love, and reconnects with his grandfather.

The Entity also tells Deadman that when Nekron attacked Earth, the contamination of his presence on the planet manifested itself in the form of a "dark avatar" who will try to destroy the Star City forest, which is the key to saving Earth's soul. The Entity reveals that Earth's savior is Alec Holland, and the "dark avatar" is a corrupted Swamp Thing, which once thought that it was Holland, but now believes itself to be Nekron. In the forest, Captain Boomerang throws one of his deadly boomerangs at Dove, but it impacts Deadman instead. As his dying act, he gives his white power ring to Holland, transforming him into a new Swamp Thing, who destroys the corrupted, original Swamp Thing. Unable to return to life, Deadman and Dove, heartbroken at being denied a happy life now that he can never again be resurrected, share an emotional farewell.

The New 52
In The New 52, Deadman's origins are rebooted in the initial run of DC Universe Presents, a new anthology book. After living a selfish life as Boston Brand, he is forced to possess people as Deadman following his assassination, to set problems in their lives right, so he can avoid an eternity in Hell. He also features as a member of the Justice League Dark, a new team of DC's more supernatural characters. Deadman uses his possession talents to help take down various supernatural threats, such as Dr. Mist and Faust Sr. Despite their earlier claim, he and Dove try to rekindle their love. However, their attempt fails miserably as Deadman insists on carrying on their relationship forward using borrowed bodies, while Dove shows disdain and repulsion to the idea. Furthermore, by helping out June Moone, they both gain the enmity of a crazed Enchantress.

DC Rebirth
As part of the DC Rebirth continuity, a three-part miniseries, Deadman: Dark Mansion of Forbidden Love was released in October 2016. The story featured the creative team of Sarah Vaughn (writer) and Lan Medina (artist). Deadman also appears in the Trinity book, focused on Batman, Superman, and Wonder Woman, along with his fellow Justice League Dark teammates Zatanna and John Constantine.

In the pages of "The New Golden Age", Deadman was sought out by Doctor Fate and Detective Chimp so that they can understand more about Hauhet who is the new guiding force behind the Helmet of Fate. When a Huntress from a possible future arrives in the present after her visit to 1940, she finds herself in the company of Deadman, Doctor Fate, and Detective Chimp.

Powers and abilities
As a disembodied spirit, Deadman could not be seen or heard by most others (certain mystics could still perceive him), was able to pass through objects, and could fly or float. He was able to possess any living being (human or animal), control their actions, and could communicate with people through another's body. Furthermore, the possession process is nearly instant in transition, enabling Deadman to possess different bodies in rapid succession for tactical advantage in combat. In one storyline, however, he could not control certain criminal henchmen he possessed due to their minds being under post-hypnotic suggestion (since their minds were not truly theirs in that instance). The people he possessed retained no memory of the experience. He has issues possessing those with stronger minds like Batman and is often forced out in a short amount of time. Deadman also has problems with magic as his spiritual form can be manipulated by it to some degree. In the Justice League Dark animated movie, Batman needed to remain in contact with all teammates, but couldn't because of Deadman, and Batman didn't want Deadman to possess him, so Batman asked Constantine to relay Deadman's words to him, but Constantine refused and instead cast a spell to allow Batman to see Deadman.

As a living human, he is an Olympic-level athlete well-trained in acrobatics. As a wearer of a White power ring he possesses whatever powers the ring confers upon its wielder. These powers, so far, include flight, invisibility (or the ability to cloak his presence), teleportation, healing severe wounds, making solid energy constructs, and the power to bring beings back to life. He had no control over these new powers and the scope and limitations on those powers are as yet undefined. The Black Lantern power ring gave his reanimated corpse similar abilities, but it reanimates the dead instead of fully resurrecting them.

Other versions

Kingdom Come
Deadman appeared twice briefly in Mark Waid and Alex Ross' Elseworlds story Kingdom Come, first as an extra in a metahuman bar (alongside Rorschach, Obsidian, and the Question), and second when Norman McCay is traveling with the Spectre, where he offered some words of encouragement to Norman and explained how the Spectre has lost touch with his humanity. He appears as a skeleton wearing the tattered remains of his Deadman uniform. He introduces himself as simply "Boston", and also appears in the sequel The Kingdom as a guide to time-lost, deceased versions of Superman. This version of Deadman was made into an action figure by DC Direct for Series 3 of their Kingdom Come line.

The Books of Magic
Deadman also appears in Neil Gaiman's story The Books of Magic, looking very similar to his appearance in Kingdom Come. He possesses the body of several people throughout the comic, trying to warn Timothy Hunter about a coming danger.

Vertigo
In 2006, a DC Comics imprint Vertigo traded some of its trademark characters with others of DC's. Among the swaps was Vertigo's Jonah Hex in exchange for Deadman. The result was a continuing series published later that year.

Bizarro World
Deadman also had a brief comic in the book Bizarro World where he was interested in meeting girls and dating while in Limbo.

Superman & Batman: Generation II
During Superman & Batman: Generations II, Deadman is summoned by Doctor Occult to assist the third Batman (Bruce Wayne, Junior, the son of the first Batman) to investigate the elderly Joker's apparent delusions that Batman is trying to kill him. By possessing the Joker's body, Deadman discovers that the Joker is being haunted by the ghost of Dick Grayson.  Grayson's ghost is seeking revenge, as the Joker killed him when Grayson was in the role of Batman.  
While the Joker's insane mind makes it difficult for Deadman to possess the criminal, he is able to hold on long enough to allow the ghost of Alfred Pennyworth to convince the ghost of Grayson that is his time to pass on.

Superman/Batman
Deadman appeared briefly in Jeph Loeb's "Absolute Power" story arc in Superman/Batman, in which he attempted to possess Superman after he and Batman killed off all the monks of Nanda Parbat (under orders from their adoptive parents, who saw the monks as a threat to their plans in an alternate timeline). Deadman is prevented from using Superman's strength to kill Batman when Batman uses a spell from Zatanna to trap Deadman inside a crystal.

Flashpoint
In the alternate timeline of the Flashpoint storyline, Boston Brand is a part of the Haly's Circus, featured in a show alongside the Flying Graysons. Boston is still as obnoxious and arrogant as he was before he died and does not wish to be a part of the circus. Brand makes fun of the circus' fortune teller Doctor Fate until Fate gives him a vision of Boston himself standing over a dead Dick Grayson. Before the next show, Boston tries to convince Dick to go solo as he himself had. However, Dick tells him that family means too much to him. Dick poses the question that Boston's seeming fearlessness could stem from his insecurity of being alone. Haley Circus is attacked by Amazons who want the Helm of Nabu. While Boston, along with the circus, is running away from the Amazons, they are rescued by the Resistance member Vertigo. When they are hiding, Boston tells Dick to leave his father since he's fatally wounded, but Dick refuses. Before he dies Dick's father asks Boston to protect his son. Later, Boston and Dick are running around the countryside looking for reinforcements, when they are soon caught in an explosion. It appears that they both survived the explosion, but when Boston tells Dick he is okay, Dick walks through him towards Boston's dead body behind him. Boston realizes that he is now a ghost whose presence cannot be seen or heard. He helps Dick, keeping him safe from the Amazons. Meeting up with the Resistance, Boston aids Dick who has become the new Doctor Fate and lets him know that he is not alone.

In other media

Television
 Following the success of X-Men (2000), Warner Bros. Television announced that a Deadman television film for TNT was in development, which was also being considered as a pilot for a potential television series. The project was in development until 2003, but was later shelved.
 Deadman appears in the Justice League Unlimited episode "Dead Reckoning", voiced by Raphael Sbarge. This version is Rama Kushna's champion and has previously worked with Batman to solve his murder before coming to reside in a temple at Nanda Parbat.
 Deadman appears in the Batman: The Brave and the Bold episode "Dawn of the Deadman!", voiced by Michael Rosenbaum. While this version's origin remains largely the same, he is not stated to have a connection to Rama Kushna. Additionally, he suffers from melancholic self-pity over not knowing how or why he is unable to "cross over" until he joins forces with Batman, Green Arrow, and Speedy to defeat Gentleman Ghost and becomes a hero.
 In 2011, WBTV hired Supernatural creator Eric Kripke to helm a Deadman television series for The CW as the network was looking to commission a new superhero series. The following year, another superhero series, Arrow, debuted on the network. The Deadman series never materialized and Kripke has since moved on to other projects.
 Boston Brand's corpse appears in the Teen Titans Go! episode "La Larva de Amor".
 Deadman appears in a self-titled segment of DC Nation Shorts, voiced by Matt L. Jones.

Film
 Guillermo del Toro has taken interest in producing a film about Deadman, supposedly from the only source. Variety reported that Nikolaj Arcel was set to direct.
 Deadman appears in Justice League Dark, voiced by Nicholas Turturro.
 Deadman appears in Teen Titans Go! To the Movies.
 The Dick Grayson incarnation of Deadman, dubbed "Deadwing", appears in Injustice.

Video games
 Deadman makes a non-speaking cameo appearance in Raiden's ending for Injustice 2 as a founding member of the Justice League Dark.
 Deadman appears as a playable character in Lego DC Super-Villains, as part of the "Justice League Dark DLC Character Pack", voiced by Steve Blum.

Miscellaneous
 Boston Brand / Deadman appears in The Batman Adventures as a performer for Haly's Circus and the champion of a male Rama Kushna
 Boston Brand appears in Batman and Robin Adventures #15 as a performer for Haly's Circus who took over for the Flying Graysons.
 Boston Brand / Deadman appears in Batman: Gotham Adventures #6.
 Boston Brand / Deadman appears in the Injustice: Gods Among Us prequel comic. After being defeated by Mister Mxyzptlk disguised as the Spectre, Brand passes on his powers to the recently deceased Dick Grayson before moving on to the afterlife.

Collected editions

Notes

References
 Dennis O'Neil and Neal Adams, The Deadman Collection, DC Comics, 2001,  .
 Jack Kirby, Jack Kirby's Fourth World Omnibus Volume Three, DC Comics, 2007, .

External links
 Deadman at Comic Vine

1967 comics debuts
Comics characters introduced in 1967
Characters created by Carmine Infantino
Characters created by Arnold Drake
Comics by Neal Adams
DC Comics male superheroes
DC Comics titles
DC Comics fantasy characters
DC Comics superheroes
DC Comics undead characters
Fictional ghosts
Fictional characters who can turn intangible
Fictional characters who can turn invisible 
Fictional characters with spirit possession or body swapping abilities
Undead superheroes
Fictional trapeze artists